Justicia angustifolia is a plant native to the Cerrado vegetation of Brazil.

See also
 List of plants of Cerrado vegetation of Brazil

External links
 Flora vascular do bioma Cerrado

angustifolia
Flora of Brazil